The Wittenberghorn is a mountain of the Bernese Alps, located on the border between the Swiss cantons of Vaud and Bern. It lies approximately halfway between L'Etivaz (Vaud) and Feutersoey (Bern), south of the Col de Jable.

References

External links
 Wittenberghorn on Hikr

Mountains of the Alps
Mountains of Switzerland
Mountains of the canton of Bern
Mountains of the canton of Vaud
Bern–Vaud border
Two-thousanders of Switzerland